Marywil was a former building complex in Warsaw.

Marywil may also refer to the following villages:
Marywil, Łódź Voivodeship (central Poland)
Marywil, Masovian Voivodeship (east-central Poland)
Marywil, Pomeranian Voivodeship (north Poland)